Crimona is a genus of moths of the family Noctuidae erected by John Bernhardt Smith in 1902.

Species
Crimona grisalba Köhler, 1979
Crimona leuca Köhler, 1979
Crimona nana Angulo & Olivares, 1999
Crimona pallimedia Smith, 1902
Crimona tricolor Köhler, 1979

References

External links
Original description: Journal of the New York Entomological Society. (1902). 10: 49

Amphipyrinae